is a railway station in Kashima, Saga Prefecture. It is operated by JR Kyushu on the Nagasaki Main Line.

Lines

Station layout 
The station consists of an island platform serving two tracks. The station building is of traditional Japanese design with a tiled roof. It houses a ticket window, a waiting room, a shop and a sales area for tourist souvenirs. Access to the island platform is by means of an underpass.

Around the time of the Kashima Gatalympics, a boat is on display, filled with mud.  Small crabs and mudskippers live within this temporary environment.

Management of the station has been outsourced to the JR Kyushu Tetsudou Eigyou Co., a wholly owned subsidiary of JR Kyushu specialising in station services. It staffs the ticket window which is equipped with a Midori no Madoguchi facility.

Adjacent stations

History
Japanese Government Railways (JGR) built the station in the 1930s during the development of an alternative route for the Nagasaki Main Line along the coast of the Ariake Sea. Hizen-Kashima opened on the same day as an intermediate station on the track. With the privatization of Japanese National Railways (JNR), the successor of JGR, on 1 April 1987, control of the station passed to JR Kyushu.

Passenger statistics
In fiscal 2016, the station was used by an average of 1,167 passengers daily (boarding passengers only), and it ranked 145th among the busiest stations of JR Kyushu.

Environs
Yūtoku Inari Shrine. The station is the closest limited express stop to the shrine and hence there are many people arriving and departing during the Japanese New Year.
Yūtoku Bus Center
National Route 207

See also
 List of railway stations in Japan

References

External links
Hizen-Kashima Station (JR Kyushu)

Railway stations in Saga Prefecture
Nagasaki Main Line
Railway stations in Japan opened in 1930